Eminence is an unincorporated town in Adams Township, Morgan County, in the U.S. state of Indiana.

History
Eminence was laid out in July 1855 by William Wigal. The name possibly is commendatory; but according to some accounts it is descriptive, as the village site allegedly was the highest point between Indianapolis and Vincennes when State Road 67 was surveyed.

The post office at Eminence has been in operation since 1857.

Education
Eminence is served by the Eminence School Corporation.

Eminence has a public library, a branch of the Morgan County Public Library.

Notable people

Glenn M. Curtis, four-time Indiana state champion basketball coach (Lebanon & Martinsville) and coach at Indiana State and the high school coach of John Wooden.

References

Unincorporated communities in Morgan County, Indiana
Unincorporated communities in Indiana
Indianapolis metropolitan area